Kariana is a small village in Amreli district in the state of Gujarat, India. It is on the road from Babra to Gadhda. You can also visit Ghela Somnath temple distance 15 from the Kariyana.

Description 
This village has many peacocks and there is a temple of Mahadev (Lord Shankar). There is also a Swaminarayan Temple which is holy place where Lord Sahjanand Swami stayed for some days. 

There is a beautiful lake outside the village's residential area. The village gets water from this lake for agriculture and household uses. The lake is crowded by Australian crane birds during winter.

The road is small size made of tar. Vehicles driving in both directions have to watch that they do not collide. One can see small hills on both sides of the road. The main crops in the fields is peanuts and cotton.

References 

Villages in Amreli district